"Five Feet High and Rising" is a song written and originally recorded by Johnny Cash.

The song was recorded by Cash on March 12, 1959 for his third Columbia album and released as a single on July 6, 1959, with "I Got Stripes" (another song from the same recording session) on the opposite side.

Content
The song is a first person account of the 1937 Mississippi flood that Cash, then aged four years and 11 months, endured with his family. They had to leave their home and flee.

Legacy

The song provided the inspiration for the name of De La Soul's debut album "Three Feet High and Rising" and is sampled in the song "The Magic Number."

Charts

References

Johnny Cash songs
1959 singles
Songs written by Johnny Cash
Columbia Records singles
1959 songs
Song recordings produced by Don Law